Vernoniopsis is a genus of flowering plants in the aster tribe within the sunflower family.

The genus was circumscribed by Jean-Henri Humbert in Mém. Inst. Sci. Madagascar, Sér. B, Biol. Vég. vol.6 on page 155 in 1955.

The genus name of Vernoniopsis is in honour of William Vernon (1666/67 - ca.1711), who was an English plant collector, (bryologist) and entomologist from Cambridge University, who collected in Maryland, USA in 1698.

Species
There are 2 known species;
 Vernoniopsis caudata  - found only in Madagascar.
 Vernoniopsis lokohensis  - also native to Madagascar

References

Asteraceae genera
Astereae
Endemic flora of Madagascar